The men's hammer throw event at the 1997 Summer Universiade was held at the Stadio Cibali in Catania, Italy, on 26 August.

Medalists

Results

Qualification

Final

References

Athletics at the 1997 Summer Universiade
1997